Pablo Zierold Reyes (19 December 1914 – 6 October 1982) was a Mexican swimmer. He competed in the men's 200 metre breaststroke at the 1932 Summer Olympics.

References

External links
 

1914 births
1982 deaths
Mexican male breaststroke swimmers
Olympic swimmers of Mexico
Swimmers at the 1932 Summer Olympics
Swimmers from Mexico City
Central American and Caribbean Games medalists in swimming
Central American and Caribbean Games bronze medalists for Mexico
Competitors at the 1935 Central American and Caribbean Games